The flag of Nazi Germany, officially the flag of the German Reich, featured a red background with a black swastika on a white disc. This flag came into use initially as the banner of the Nazi Party (NSDAP) after its foundation. Following the appointment of Adolf Hitler as Chancellor in 1933, this flag was adopted as one of the nation's dual national flags, the other being the black-white-red triband of the German Empire.

This dual flag arrangement ended on 15 September 1935, one year after the death of Reich President Paul von Hindenburg, and the Nazi flag became the only national flag of Germany. One reason for the change may have been the "Bremen incident" of 26 July 1935, in which a group of demonstrators in New York City boarded the ocean liner SS Bremen, tore the Nazi Party flag from the jackstaff, and tossed it into the Hudson River. When the German ambassador protested, US officials responded that the German national flag had not been harmed, only a political party symbol. The new flag law was announced at the annual party rally in Nuremberg in 1935, where Hermann Göring claimed the old black-white-red flag, while honoured, was the symbol of a bygone era and under threat of being used by "reactionaries".

History

Origins

After rejecting many suggestions and colors, the process of choosing a new flag was described by Hitler as follows:

After Hitler was appointed Chancellor of Germany on 30 January 1933, the black-red-gold tricolour flag was discarded; a ruling on 12 March established two legal national flags: the reintroduced black-white-red imperial tricolour and the flag of the Nazi Party.

Nazi ensigns had a through and through image, so the "left-facing" and "right-facing" version were each present on one side. However, the Nazi flag on land was right-facing on both sides.

Albert Speer, in his book Inside the Third Reich, stated that: "in only two other designs did he (Adolf Hitler) execute the same care as he did his Obersalzberg house: that of the Reich War Flag and his own standard of Chief of State", showing that Hitler was an avid vexillographer (flag designer).

An off-centred disk version of the swastika flag was used as the civil ensign on German-registered civilian ships and was used as the Jack on Kriegsmarine warships. There is debate as to whether the off-centred disk flag was the official national flag from 1935 to 1945, such as at the popular vexillogy site, Flags of the World. The centred-disk flag was commonly used by civilians and the German armed forces aside from the navy.

Symbolism
The Nazi flag takes its colours from the imperial tricolour, with Hitler writing that he "was always for keeping the old colours," because he saw them as his "most sacred possession" as a soldier, and also because they suited his personal taste. Hitler added new symbolism to the colours, stating that "[t]he red expressed the social thought underlying the movement. White the national thought," and that the black swastika was an emblem of the "Aryan race" and "the ideal of creative work which is in itself and always will be anti-Semitic."

Since 1945
At the end of World War II, after the defeat of Nazi Germany, the first law enacted by the Allied Control Council abolished all symbols and repealed all relevant laws of the Reich. The possession of swastika flags has been forbidden in several countries since then, with the importation or display of them forbidden particularly in Germany.

Today, the Nazi flag remains in common use by neo-Nazi supporters and sympathisers, outside Germany, while within the country, neo-Nazis use the Fatherland Flag from the German Empire instead, due to ban on the Nazi flag use. However, the imperial flag did not originally have any racist or anti-Semitic meaning.

Standard of Adolf Hitler

The personal standard of Adolf Hitler (Führerstandarte) was designed after Reichspräsident Paul von Hindenburg had died on 2 August 1934. Hitler abolished the title "Reichspräsident" and in its place instituted the title of "Führer" which henceforth could only be used when referring to him personally. Hindenburg used a personal standard consisting of a black eagle on a square gold background edged by a border of black, white and red bands. Hitler decided on 19 August 1934 to adopt a personal standard for himself, which was called "personal standard for Adolf Hitler as Leader and Chancellor of the German Nation". As he was also Supreme Commander of the Armed Forces it was somewhat later known as "the personal standard for Adolf Hitler as Leader and Supreme Commander of the Armed Forces".

The standard was used for all purposes and consisted of a square of red material in a variety of regulated sizes. In the centre of the square was a white disk, containing a garland of gold-coloured oak-leaves. Set on the white disk was a black upright swastika. In each corner of the red field was a gold-coloured eagle emblem: In the upper left and lower right corner it was a Party eagle, whereas it was a Wehrmacht eagle in the upper right and lower left corner. The entire standard was edged on all four sides with a border of black and white bands.

The flag was designed by Hitler personally. It was made in two forms: a normal cloth flag (which flew at the Reichs Chancellery when he was present), and a 'solid' type which was used on his car, at rallies, and other political events. Both types were also used at his residence at Obersalzberg.

The 1st SS Panzer Division Leibstandarte SS Adolf Hitler (LSSAH) used a variant of the Führerstandarte as their regimental and battalion color that was introduced in September 1940 after the German victory over France. There was also a standard for the "Führer Escort Battalion". It had a great similarity to the guidon used by the LSSAH but could be distinguished, apart from other details, by the different color of the fringes: LSSAH used gold, while the FBB used silver.

Trophy standards

Following the Battle of Berlin, many German standards and flags were taken to Moscow. They were thrown at the foot of Lenin's Mausoleum in a gesture of enemy humiliation during the 1945 Moscow Victory Parade.

See also
 Flag of Germany
 List of German flags
 Reichskriegsflagge
 List of flags of the Wehrmacht and Heer (1933–1945)
 List of flags of the Luftwaffe (1933–1945)
 List of flags of the German Navy (1935–1945)
 Colours, standards and guidons

Notes

References

External links
 Provision in the German penal code making the display, ownership, manufacturing, trade or storage of the flag illegal (in German)
 Imperial German Empire Army Colours 

1935 establishments in Germany
1945 disestablishments in Germany
Nazi Germany
Nazi Germany, Flag of
Nazi Germany
Swastika
Adolf Hitler
Nazi Germany
Nazi Germany
Symbols of Nazi Germany